Statistics of the 1976 Cameroonian Premier League season.

Overview
Union Douala won the championship.

References
Cameroon - List of final tables (RSSSF)

1976 in Cameroonian football
Cam
Cam
Elite One seasons